Gaston Millochau (born 1866, date of death unknown) was a French astronomer.

From 1899 until 1903 he observed Mars at the Meudon Observatory and reported some details visible on its surface. In contrast to other observers at that time he did not see any canal-like features.

A crater on Mars was named in his honor. Awarded the Janssen Medal from the French Academy of Sciences in 1905.

External links
History of Mars canals mentioning Millochau

1866 births
19th-century French astronomers
Year of death missing
20th-century French astronomers